In enzymology, an uridine kinase is an enzyme that catalyzes the chemical reaction

ATP + uridine  ADP + UMP

Thus, the two substrates of this enzyme are ATP and uridine, whereas its two products are ADP and UMP.

This enzyme belongs to the family of transferases, specifically those transferring phosphorus-containing groups (phosphotransferases) with an alcohol group as acceptor.  The systematic name of this enzyme class is ATP:uridine 5'-phosphotransferase. Other names in common use include pyrimidine ribonucleoside kinase, uridine-cytidine kinase, uridine kinase (phosphorylating), and uridine phosphokinase.  This enzyme participates in pyrimidine metabolism.

Structural studies

References 

 
 

EC 2.7.1
Enzymes of known structure